Jena Malone is an American actress who first gained critical recognition for her screen debut in Bastard out of Carolina (1996), for which she was nominated for an Independent Spirit Award, a Screen Actors Guild Award, and a Satellite Award. She gained further recognition for her role in the television film Hope, for which she was nominated for a Golden Globe Award for Best Actress in a Miniseries or Television Film. In 1998, Malone won a Saturn Award for Best Performance by a Younger Actor for her role in Contact (1997).

CableACE Awards

Fangoria Chainsaw Awards

Gold Derby Awards

Golden Globe Awards
The Golden Globe Award is an accolade bestowed by the 93 members of the Hollywood Foreign Press Association (HFPA) recognizing excellence in film and television, both domestic and foreign.

Independent Spirit Awards
The Independent Spirit Awards are presented annually by Film Independent, to award best in the independent filmmaking.

Satellite Awards
The Satellite Awards are presented annually by the International Press Academy.

Saturn Awards
The Saturn Awards are presented annually by the Academy of Science Fiction, Fantasy and Horror Films to honor science fiction, fantasy, and horror films, television, and home video.

Screen Actors Guild Awards
Established in 1995, the Screen Actors Guild Awards are presented annually by the Screen Actors Guild‐American Federation of Television and Radio Artists, and aim to recognize excellent achievements in film and television.

Teen Choice Awards

Young Artist Awards

YoungStar Awards

References

Lists of awards received by American actor